Samuel "Samu" Pérez Fariña (born 26 April 1997) is a Spanish professional footballer who plays for Real Valladolid Promesas as a goalkeeper.

Club career
Born in Tegueste, Tenerife, Canary Islands, Pérez joined Sevilla FC's youth setup in 2014 from Juventud Laguna CF. He made his senior debut with the C-team on 17 September of that year, starting in a 0–2 Tercera División home loss against CD Gerena.

Pérez subsequently became a regular starter for Sevilla C in the following campaigns, and on 1 June 2018 he made his professional debut with the reserves by starting in a 1–2 away loss against Lorca FC in the Segunda División. On 5 July, he moved to another reserve team, Real Valladolid B of the Segunda División B.

Pérez made his first-team – and La Liga – debut on 16 July 2020, coming on as a second-half substitute for José Antonio Caro in a 1–3 away loss against SD Eibar.

References

External links

1997 births
Living people
People from Tenerife
Sportspeople from the Province of Santa Cruz de Tenerife
Spanish footballers
Footballers from the Canary Islands
Association football goalkeepers
La Liga players
Segunda División players
Tercera División players
Sevilla FC C players
Sevilla Atlético players
Real Valladolid Promesas players
Real Valladolid players